This article briefly introduces a list of better known Kurdish historical sites (Kurdish: Asewari mêjûyi Kurdan). Apart from Kurdish historical sites within Kurdistan, non-Kurdish sites within Kurdistan, and Kurdish sites outside of Kurdistan are also included.

Sites in Iran and Iranian Kurdistan
Dimdim Castle, West Azarbaijan Province
Mizgewti sûr, (Red Mosque), West Azarbaijan Province, Mahabad
Serdar Castle, West Azarbaijan Province
Sna castle, Kurdistan province, Sanandaj

Sites in Iraqi Kurdistan
Pira Delal
Tomb of Cyaxares, Qyzqapan, Sulaymaniyah
Tomb of the Prophet Hazkiel, Amadiya, Iraqi Kurdistan, The tomb is Considered holy to Muslims, Christians and Jews.
Lalish Temple, Located in Nineveh, Iraq, the temple is considered a sacred place of worship for the Yezidi Kurds, According to Historians and archaeologists The site and temple is believed to date back to approximately 4,000 years 
Xarab-I Kilashin, ancient city rediscovered in 2017 near the Grand Zab River in Iraqi Kurdistan 
Hawler Citadel, Erbil is first mentioned in literary sources by the Sumerians around 2300 B.C, According to Giovanni Pettinato, author of several publications about Mesopotamian civilizations, Erbil is mentioned in two tablets as "Irbilum". The city was largely under the rule of Sumerians, however in 2200 BC, the king of the Gutians, Erridupizir, conquered the city. 
Dwin Castle, Said to have been belonged to the family of the Kurdish Sultan Saladin
Ruins of Yassin tepe; Capital city of ancient Sharazor

Khanzad Castle, located east of Hawler, it lies on Erbil-Shaqlawa road and is one of the archaeological sites in the city of Erbil.
Shirwanah Castle, Kalar, Iraqi Kurdistan, The Castle was Home to the Kurdish Jaff family
Shanidar Cave

Sites in Turkish Kurdistan
Diyarbakir City Walls
Hasankeyf, Batman
Hoşap Castle in Güzelsu
Ishak Pasha Palace, Doğubeyazıt
Pool of Sacred Fish, Urfa
Mount Nemrud
Ahlat
Pira Dehderî Bridge, historic bridge in Diyarbakır over the river of Tigris, The bridge was commissioned by Nizam al-Din and Muyyid al-Dawla during the Kurdish-Marwanid dynasty era  in Diyarbakır, and was built by architect Yusuf son of Ubeyd in 1065
Daras
Ani

Sites in Syria and Syrian Kurdistan
Afrin (includes Julianus Church and the Ain Dara Site which was Seriously damaged by Turkish Forces during the Afrin Operation)
Abu'l-Fida Mosque, Hama, Syria, Erected by the Kurdish Prince and Local Governor of Hama Abulfeda
Hisn al-Akrad, originally a Kurdish settlement for Kurdish Mirdasid Soldiers
Bab al-Ahmar (Red gate) located in Aleppo, Syria. built during the reign of the Ayyubid emir of Aleppo al-Aziz Muhammad and renovated by the Mamluk Sultan Qansuh II al-Ghawri at the beginning of the 16th century
Al-Adiliyah Madrasa, Damascus, Syria, 13th-century madrasah which was built by the Kurdish-Ayyubid Sultan Al-Adil I
Citadel of Damascus, partially Modified by Sultan Saladin in 1174, re-built completely by the Ayyubid Sultan Al-Adil between the years 1203-1216.
Nimrod Fortress, Mount Hermon, built by the Ayyubid Kurdish Sultan Al-Malik al-Aziz Uthman.
Citadel of Aleppo, partially Ayyubid-built, greatly expanded under the Ayyubids and was Strongly fortified for protection from the Crusaders and local raiders.

References

Lists of historic places
Kurdish culture